Christiaan or Christian van der Goes (1530s, Delft – 22 September 1600), a Dutch nobleman, was schout of Delft from 1562 to 1577.

Christian was the son of Adriaan van der Goes, Land's Advocate of Holland (died 5 November 1560), and Anna van Spangen (died 14 April 1548). In 1558 he married Anna van Renoy, and the couple were to have seven children:
Adriaan, councillor to the Prince of Orange
Maria
Anna
Gerard Renoy, who died 8 August 1623 after serving many years in the Army of Flanders
Laurens, who died at Vlissingen of wounds suffered in the Siege of Ostend
Aernout, a canon and member of St. Michael's Abbey, Antwerp
Kornelis

He was appointed schout (representative of royal authority) for Delft in 1562, and initially kept his position on the city executive at the change of government in Delft in 1572 (see Dutch Revolt). As one of the heirs of Cornelis Musius, an important clergyman killed in December 1572, he managed to obtain the release of Musius's sequestered library. A loyal Catholic, he was forced out of office in 1577.

References

1530s births
1600 deaths
16th-century Dutch people
Dutch nobility
Dutch Roman Catholics
People from Delft